Just for Laughs was an Australian light entertainment television program that aired on the Nine Network. The show was hosted by David Whitehill, and showed humorous hidden cameras clips from around the world.

Just For Laughs Comedy Festival
Just For Laughs Australia, is filmed at the Sydney Opera House during the Just For Laughs Comedy Festival (Network Ten 2013–) (Fox Comedy 2013–)

See also

 List of Australian television series

References

External links

Nine Network original programming
2007 Australian television series debuts
2007 Australian television series endings
Sydney Opera House